This is a list of cities, towns and villages in the county of East Sussex, England.

A
Alciston, Alfriston, Arlington

B
Barcombe, Barcombe Cross, Barcombe Mills, Battle, Beachy Head,  Beckley Furnace, Bells Yew Green, Belmont, Berwick, Bexhill-on-Sea, Birling Gap, Bishopstone, Bodiam, Brede, Brighton, Broadland Row, Broad Oak Brede, Broad Oak Heathfield, Burwash, Buxted

C
 Camber, Clive Vale, Cock Marling, Cripps Corner, Crowborough, Chiddingly, Chailey, Cooksbridge

D
Denton, Ditchling, Downside

E
Eastbourne, East Dean, East Guldeford, Eridge Green, Etchingham, Exceat

F
Fairwarp, Falmer, Filching, Five Ash Down, Folkington, Forest Row, Frant

G
 Groombridge

H
Hadlow Down, Hailsham, Hammerwood, Hampden Park, Hangleton, Hankham, Hartfield, Hastings, Heathfield, Herstmonceux, Hollington

I
Icklesham, Iford, Isfield

J
 Jevington

K
Kingston near Lewes

L
Langney, Lewes, Lower Dicker, Lower Willingdon (see Willingdon and Jevington), Litlington

M
Maresfield, Mayfield, Meads

N
Newhaven, Newick, Northiam, Norton, Nutley

O
Ore (Hastings)

P
Peacehaven, Pevensey, Pevensey Bay, Piddinghoe, Playden, Polegate, Portslade

R
Ringmer, Robertsbridge, Rodmell, Rottingdean, Rye, Rye Harbour

S
Saltdean, Seaford, Sedlescombe, Sidley, Silver Hill, Southease, South Heighton, Sunnyside, Sutton, St Anthony's Hill (Eastbourne), Stone Cross, Southease

T
Telscombe, Telscombe Cliffs, Ticehurst, Tarring Neville, Three Cups Corner

U
Uckfield, Udimore

W
Wadhurst, Wannock, Westham, Willingdon, Wilmington, Winchelsea, Withyham, Witherenden,

See also
List of settlements in East Sussex by population
List of places in England

East Sussex
Places